Jason Robinson may refer to:

 Jason Robinson (cricketer) (born 1965), English cricketer
 Jason Robinson (musician) (born 1975), American jazz  musician and composer
 Jason Robinson (rugby) (born 1974), English rugby league and rugby union player
 Jason WA Robinson (scientist) (born 1980), English academic at the University of Cambridge